The African National Congress retained majorities in the National Assembly of South Africa & National Council of Provinces as well as in eight of the nine provincial legislatures, but lost control of the Western Cape.  Members are elected using party-list proportional representation.

National Assembly (National List)
Candidates whose names are in bold were elected on the ANC's national list to Parliament.

Jacob Zuma
Kgalema Motlanthe
Baleka Mbete
Trevor Manuel
Winnie Madikizela-Mandela
Nkosazana Dlamini-Zuma
Jeffrey Radebe
Lindiwe Sisulu
Blade Nzimande
Naledi Pandor
Fikile Mbalula
Nosiviwe Nqakula
Zola Skweyiya
Nozizwe Routledge
Nathi Mthethwa
Bathabile Dlamini
Pallo Jordan
Angie Motshekga
Malusi Gigaba
Barbara Hogan
Sicelo Shiceka
Nomaindia Mfeketo
Makhenkesi Stofile
Manto Tshabalala-Msimang
Ngoako Ramatlhodi
Rejoice Mabudafhasi
Enoch Godongwana
Lindiwe Hendricks
Charles Nqakula
Susan Shabangu
Tokyo Sexwale
Lulama Xingwana
Siphiwe Nyanda
Buyelwa Sonjica
S'bu Ndebele
Lumka Yengeni
Jeremy Cronin
Maite Nkoana-Mashabane
Max Sisulu
Susan Van Der Merwe
Sango Patekile Holomisa
Dipuo Peters
Mathole Motshekga
Lindiwe Zulu
Collins Chabane
LIST INCOMPLETE

See also
African National Congress
2009 South African general election

References

Elections in South Africa
History of the African National Congress